The 2013–14 Missouri Tigers men's basketball team represented the University of Missouri in the 2013–14 NCAA Division I men's basketball season. Their head coach was Frank Haith, who was in his third and final year at Missouri. The team played its home games at Mizzou Arena in Columbia, Missouri, and was playing its second season in the Southeastern Conference.

On January 13, 2016, it was announced that all 23 wins from the 2013-14 season were to be vacated as a result of a 19-month investigation by the university and the NCAA into the program and former coach Frank Haith.

Preseason
In 2013–14 Head Coach Frank Haith once again returned just one starter (Jabari Brown) and ushered in a number of new players as he looked to continue the most prolific NCAA Tournament run in school history. It was essentially a third new team for Haith, who has less than 40 percent of his scoring, rebounding, assists and steals back from the previous season. However the addition of a Top 20 recruiting class, the returning experience of players like seniors Earnest Ross and Tony Criswell and the gained services of heralded transfer Jordan Clarkson had excitement buzzing around Mizzou Arena as the Tigers began their second tour as members of a much improved Southeastern Conference.

Departures

Newcomers

Roster

Schedule and results

|-
!colspan=12 style="background:#F1B82D; color:#000000;"| Exhibition 
|-

|-
!colspan=12 style="background:#F1B82D; color:#000000;"| Non-conference regular season

|-
!colspan=12 style="background:#F1B82D; color:#000000;"| SEC regular season

|-
!colspan=12 style="background:#F1B82D;"| SEC Tournament

|-
!colspan=12 style="background:#F1B82D;"| NIT

Source:

References 

Missouri
Missouri Tigers men's basketball seasons
Missouri
Missouri Tigers men's basketball team
2014 in sports in Missouri